Radwański is a Polish locational surname, which means a person from a place in Poland called Radwan. Alternative spellings include Radwanski, Radwańska and Radwansky. The surname may refer to:

Ed Radwanski (born 1963), American soccer player
George Radwanski (1947–2014), Canadian journalist
Krzysztof Radwański (born 1978), Polish football player

See also
Radovan
Radwańska

References

Polish-language surnames